Doryichthys deokhatoides is a species of freshwater fish of the family Syngnathidae. It is found in the Mekong basin, Chao Phraya basin, Malay Peninsula, Sumatra and Borneo. It is benthopelagic. This species is ovoviviparous, with males carrying eggs in a brood pouch before giving birth to live young. This species is normally found along river stretches with a slow current, amongst grasses, roots or marginal vegetation.

References

Further reading

Encyclopedia of Life
iNaturalist

deokhatoides
Marine fish
Taxa named by Pieter Bleeker
Fish described in 1856